18½ is a 2021 American thriller/comedy film directed by Dan Mirvish, written by Daniel Moya, with a story by Dan Mirvish and Daniel Moya. The film stars Willa Fitzgerald, John Magaro, Vondie Curtis-Hall, Catherine Curtin, Richard Kind, Sullivan Jones and the voices of Jon Cryer as H. R. Haldeman, Ted Raimi as Alexander Haig and Bruce Campbell as President Richard Nixon.

Plot
At the height of Watergate, a White House transcriber tries to leak the 18½-minute gap in the Nixon White House tapes to a reporter, but they run afoul of swingers, hippies and nefarious forces.

Cast

Production
The film started shooting March 3, 2020, at the Silver Sands Motel and Cottages in Greenport, Suffolk County, New York. Production was halted after 11 days because of the COVID-19 pandemic. For the next six months, Mirvish edited the footage they had, composer Luis Guerra worked on the music, and the production team recorded voice sessions for the fictional 18½-minute gap in the Nixon White House tapes with Bruce Campbell, Jon Cryer and Ted Raimi over Zoom. Filming resumed in September, 2020, for the final four days once COVID protocols were in place with the Directors Guild of America and Screen Actors Guild.

Release
Adventure Entertainment released the film theatrically in the United States starting on May 27, 2022. The film came out in the UK on July 11, 2022. The film was released on airlines JetBlue, Virgin Atlantic, Emirates, Qatar Airways, Air New Zealand and Singapore Air, through distributor Gate23.

Festivals
18½ was selected to screen at the following film festivals:
2021 Woodstock Film Festival
2021 Sao Paulo International Film Festival
2021 Gijón International Film Festival
2021 Whistler Film Festival.
2021 St. Louis Film Festival
2021 Tallgrass Film Festival
2021 Rome International Film Festival
2021 Anchorage International Film Festival.
2022 Manchester International Film Festival
2022 Cinequest Film Festival
2022 RiverRun International Film Festival
2022 Oxford Film Festival

Reception

The review aggregator website Rotten Tomatoes gave the film a 78% approval rating, based on 45 reviews. The website's consensus reads, "Some tonal inconsistency makes 18 1/2 more of a 7/10, but this well-acted period piece mines the Watergate scandal for fresh, insightful dramedy."

Richard Roeper of the Chicago Sun-Times wrote, "Just when you thought we might have covered this dark chapter in American history from all angles, along comes the slyly subversive, occasionally loony and thoroughly entertaining 18 ½, which is fictional and yet contains essential truths and clever insights throughout." Matt Zoller Seitz of RogerEbert.com wrote, "it's a film that sticks in the mind after you've watched it. Every choice is made with confidence, but from an intuitive place, like decisions made by a lucid dreamer."  Noel Murray of the Los Angeles Times wrote, "Mirvish's excellent cast approaches this sequence like a one-act play, swinging at every curveball their fellow actors throw. Nothing they're saying matters much, but they say it with such verve and passion that they pull the audience right into the free-floating anxiety of a fraught time in American history, a half-century ago."

The film was one of 301 features qualified as eligible for the 95th Academy Awards. The original songs "Brasília Bella", "Wonder Bread" and "Deadly Butterfly" from the film were 3 out of the 82 songs qualified for the 2023 Academy Awards Best Original Song category. "Brasília Bella" was considered an "Oscar Contender" by The Hollywood Reporter, IndieWire and GoldDerby.

References

External links 
 
 
 
 

American comedy thriller films
2020s comedy thriller films
2020s English-language films